The Najaf governorate election of 2009 was held on 31 January 2009 alongside elections for all other governorates outside Iraqi Kurdistan and Kirkuk.

Results 

|- style="background-color:#E9E9E9"
! style="text-align:left;vertical-align:top;" |Coalition 2005/2009!! Allied national parties !! Leader !!Seats (2005) !! Seats (2009) !! Change !!Votes
|-
| style="text-align:left;" |State of Law Coalition || style="text-align:left;" | Islamic Dawa Party || style="text-align:left;" |Nouri Al-Maliki|| – || 7 ||+7 ||54,907
|-
| style="text-align:left;" |Al Mihrab Martyr List || style="text-align:left;" |ISCI|| style="text-align:left;" |Abdul Aziz al-Hakim|| 19 || 7 || -12  ||50,146
|-
| style="text-align:left;" |Independent Free Movement List || style="text-align:left;" |Sadrist Movement || style="text-align:left;" |Muqtada al-Sadr || – || 6 || +6 ||40,186
|-
| style="text-align:left;" |Loyalty for Najaf || || style="text-align:left;" |Adnan al-Zurufi|| 9 || 4 || -5 ||30,219
|-
| style="text-align:left;" |National Reform Trend || National Reform Trend || style="text-align:left;" |Ibrahim al-Jaafari|| – || 2 || +2 ||23,377
|-
| style="text-align:left;" |Independent Najaf Union || || || – || 2 || +2 ||12,766
|-
| style="text-align:left;" |Iraqi National List  || style="text-align:left;" |Iraqi National Accord || || 3 || – || -3 ||6,640
|-
| style="text-align:left;" |Islamic Virtue Party || style="text-align:left;" |Islamic Vertue Party ||Abdelrahim Al-Husseini || 2 || – || -2 ||5,341
|-
| style="text-align:left;" |Banner of the Independents  || || || 4 || – || -4 ||
|-
| style="text-align:left;" |Allegiance Coalition || || || 2 || – || -2 ||
|-
| style="text-align:left;" |Iraq Future Gathering  || || || 2 || – || -2 ||
|-
| style="text-align:left;" |Other Parties  || || ||  ||  || || 
|-
| style="text-align:left;" colspan=2 | Total || || 41 || 28 || -13||338,540
|-
|colspan=5|Sources: this article – al Sumaria – New York Times -
|}

References 

2009 Iraqi governorate elections
Najaf Governorate